Cassin's vireo (Vireo cassinii) is a small North American songbird, ranging from southern British Columbia in Canada through the western coastal states of the United States.  This bird migrates, spending the winter from southern Arizona (the Sonoran Desert) to southern Mexico.

The vireo is 11–14 cm (4–6 inches) in length, with a gray head, back, and flanks, and whitish underparts.  It has solid white "spectacles" and white wing bars.

The song, given persistently, consists of short, rough whistled phrases of several notes, spaced about 2 seconds apart. The phrases often alternate ending on a high note and a low note, giving an impression of question and answer.

It prefers open woodlands of the western mountains and foothills.  It is usually found in the middle to lower portions of the forest canopy, where it slowly and deliberately forages for insects among the foliage.

Cassin's vireo builds a cup nest out of bark strips and down in the fork of a twig.  It lays 2 to 5 white eggs with some brown spots.

This species was formerly considered to belong to the same species as the plumbeous vireo and blue-headed vireo.  At that time, this complex of species was referred to as the "solitary vireo".

This vireo is named after the ornithologist John Cassin.

References

External links

Cassin's Vireo species account Cornell Lab of Ornithology
Cassin's Vireo at USGS
Article & RangeMaps InfoNatura NatureServe
Cassin's Vireo photo gallery VIREO
Cassin's Vireo videos on the Internet Bird Collection

Vireo (genus)
Native birds of the West Coast of the United States
Birds of the Sierra Nevada (United States)
Fauna of the Sonoran Desert
Fauna of the Lower Colorado River Valley
Birds of Mexico
Birds described in 1858
Taxa named by John Xantus